The University of Timbuktu is a collective term for the teaching associated with three mosques in the city of Timbuktu in what is now Mali: the mosques of Sankore, Djinguereber, and Sidi Yahya. It was an organized scholastic community that endured for many centuries during the medieval period. The university contributed to the modern understanding of Islamic and academic studies in West Africa during the medieval period and produced a number of scholars and manuscripts taught under the Maliki school of thought.

History of Timbuktu
Timbuktu is a city created by the Tuareg people around the late 1100s A.D. to early 1200s A.D. Due to the Tuaregs having established the area as a way-station for supplies and provisions, which was often visited by travelers and merchants passing by, it eventually became a large trading city.

Eventually Mansa Musa I (ruled 1307–1332) gained control of the city. When he traveled to Mecca in order to complete the Hajj, he returned to Mali with architects and scholars whom he had encountered along the way. He employed these people to establish mosques and universities in Timbuktu that quickly gained fame. As a result, more scholars from varied backgrounds and places traveled to the city to study and live. Some of these scholars came from Egypt, Fez, Awjila, Ghadames, and Tuat. Timbuktu acquired a reputation for learning and scholarship across the Muslim world.

According to African scholar Shamil Jeppie in The Meanings of Timbuktu:

After Timbuktu was occupied in 1591 following the Battle of Tondibi, the university went into decline and the quality of teaching in the Timbuktu mosques waned along with it. Soon after, scholars of Timbuktu emigrated to other learning centers. In 1593, Sultan Ahmad I al-Mansur cited "disloyalty" as the reason for arresting, and subsequently killing or exiling, many of Timbuktu's scholars, including Ahmad Baba al Massufi.

Mosques 

The University of Timbuktu was associated with three mosques: the Sankore Mosque, the Djinguereber Mosque, and the Sidi Yahya Mosque. The three made up an intellectual and spiritual centre throughout the golden age of Timbuktu. These mosques are also prime examples of earthen architecture, which are maintained by traditional maintenance techniques which continues to the present day. For one mosque, the Great Mosque of Djenne, the maintenance of the mosque is a festive community effort, which is known as the crépissage.

Sankore Mosque 
In 989 AD Al-Qadi Aqib ibn Mahmud ibn Umar, the Supreme Judge of Timbuktu, founded the Sankore Mosque. For over five centuries the Sankore Mosque served as a significant religious and intellectual hub. It was especially prevalent under the reign of Mansa Musa I and the Askia dynasty (1493–1591). In 1578 AD Qadi al-Aqib ibn Mahmud ibn Umar ibn Muhammad Aqit knocked down the sanctuary to have it rebuilt in accordance with the dimensions of the Kaaba of Mecca as well as adding a mihrab.

Djinguereber Mosque 
The Djinguereber Mosque was initially built when Mansa Musa I had returned from a pilgrimage to Mecca, but was reconstructed between 1570 and 1583 by Imam Al-Aqib ibn Mahmud, who was the qadi of Timbuktu. He added the southern portion of the mosque as well as the wall which surrounds the cemetery and situates itself to the west. The Djinguereber Mosque minaret is among the most noticeable landmarks of the Timbuktu landscape with its dominating structure.

Sidi Yahya Mosque 
The Sidi Yahya Mosque was named after one of the friends of ruler Muhammad-n-Allah, who was named Sidi Yahya al-Tadallisi. The Sidi Yahia Mosque, located to the south of the Sankore Mosque, was erected around 1400 AD by the marabout Sheikh El Moktar Hamalla. It was built with the expectation of a holy man who would emerge some forty years later as Cherif Sidi Yahia, who would then be chosen as the Imam. Much like the other two mosques, Sidi Yahia was also restored by Imam Al Aqib from 1577 to 1588.

The University 

In the University of Timbuktu, there were several independent schools, each having its own principal instructor. Students often took several different tutors who all specialized in their respective fields of study, and paid their tutors via either money, goods, or services.  Instruction usually took place in mosque courtyards or private residences depending on the mosque and teachers' preferences. For example, the Sankore mosque often held classes within its walls, and many scholars lived, studied, and taught in the Sankore quarter. Scholars in the Djinguereber and Sidi Yahya mosques more often would hold classes privately in their own houses where personal libraries could be used to assist the teachers. The university boasted approximately 25,000 students out of a total 100,000 of the city's population. Subjects studied in the university included geography, astronomy, medicine, and even history, despite the fact that history was never part of any teaching curriculum in the Islamic world at the time.

Teaching 
Pedagogy in Timbuktu was in line with traditional Islamic teaching methods. The teacher would dictate a lesson and the student was expected to write down said dictation. After revising the written version with the teacher, the student would then be expected to study it. At some points, along with the texts the student wrote, the student would learn from other texts along with their respective commentaries. This method is still widely used in the Islamic world. Students would write their teacher's dictation in vocalized texts (harakat), which is only seen in the Quran and educational works such as grammars and law. Religious studies were taught in Arabic instead of the indigenous languages spoken in Timbuktu. This hindered the mosques' popularity among people who were outside of the clergy.

Upon completion of studies, a turban was given for the students to wear along with an ijazah that allowed the students authorization to teach a specific subject or text. Each ijazah's value was dependent of the quality of the teacher who gave it.

Teaching curriculums 
While teaching curriculums varied, certain texts were taught throughout every institute. The Quran, Sahih al-Bukhari, Sahih Muslim, and Kitab al-Shifa were core texts for most students. Below them in order of prominence were important works in the Maliki school of thought such as: the fatwas of Ahmed al-Wanashiri, the Risala of Ibn Abi Zayd, and the Mukhtasar of Khalil ibn Ishaq.

Notable scholars
There was a long succession of scholars and imams in Timbuktu, many associated with the Sankore mosque.

Abu Hafs 
Abu Hafs Umar ibn al-hajj Ahmad ibn Umar ibn Muhammad Aqit was a grammarian and eulogist in the Sankore mosque. He was arrested by Pasha Mahmud Zarqunin and exiled to Marrakesh, Morocco until his death. This exile was considered unjust, and as a result, Abu Hafs is viewed as a martyr.

Al-Aqib Aqit 
Qadi al-Aqib ibn Mahmud ibn Umar ibn Muhammad Aqit (1507 – August 10, 1583) was a Sanhaja Berber, qadi of Timbuktu, and an Imam of the Sankore mosque. He was born to the Sanhaja Berber Aqit family where he studied under his father and uncle. He then went to make the hajj, where he studied under leading scholars like al-Nasir al-Laqani who certified him to teach a number of manuscripts. The famed Ahmad Baba, who was his cousin once removed, studied under him, and received an ijazah. In 1565, al-Aqib succeeded his brother, Qāḍī Muḥammad, as the Qadi of Timbuktu.

In 1569 AD, he began rebuilding the Sidi Yahya Mosque, and in 1570 AD renovated The Djinguereber Mosque, followed by The Sūq Mosque in 1577 AD. He rebuilt the Sankore mosque the following year.

When he died he was succeeded as Qadi by his brother Abu Hafs Umar.

Abu al-Tuwati 
Sidi Abu 'l-Qasim al-Tuwati (d. 1528/29) was the successor of Qadi Katib Musa in the Sankore mosque. He was notable establishing recitation the entire Quran after Friday prayers.

Ahmad Baba
Abu 'l-'Abbas Ahmad Baba bin Ahmad bin Ahmad bin 'Umar bin Muhammad Aqit al-Sinhaji al-Timbukti (21 Dhu 'l-Hijja 963 AH (26 October 1556) – 6 Sha'ban 1036 AH (22 April 1627)) was a popular jurist. He was born into a family who were a part of a long line of jurists. He was well known for the high quality of his fatwas, and is well known in modern times for his works being the main foundation of history concerning the history and lineages of medieval West African jurists and medieval Moroccan religious practices. He wrote over sixty texts in his lifetime covering various disciplines that ranged from grammars to philosophy.

Ahmad was born in Araouane and was raised in Timbuktu where he studied under his father Ahmad, his uncle Abu Bakr and Ahmad b. Mohammad, who was a distant relative of his. However, his principal teacher was Muhammad b. Mahmud b. Abu Bakr al-Wangari, a well known and respected scholar at the time.

He studied the main disciplines pertaining to Islamic learning of his time under Wangari, including Arabic, usul, mantiq and tafsir, with his speciality being on Maliki school of Islamic thought. Little is known about Ahmad's scholarly work in Timbuktu prior to his and some of his family's deportation to Morocco in 1594, as they were accused of undermining the rule and authority of the Moroccan invaders. He arrived in Marrakesh on 1 Ramadan 1002 (21 May 1594), where he was either jailed or put under house arrest. His two-year house arrest in Morocco was liberal, as Ahmad was able to teach at the Jami' al-Shurafa' in Marrakesh and attracted many students scholars until his release on 21 Ramadan 1004–19 May 1596. However, the Sultan had decided to keep him in Morocco.

After being released by Sultan Moulay Zaidan, Ahmad arrived back in Timbuktu on 10 Dhu 'l-Qa'da 1016 AH (26 February 1608). Although not much is known about the chronology of his works, he wrote the Nail al-ibtihaj, his major work, as well as its abridgement, Kifayat al-muhtaj, whilst he was still in Morocco.

The Nail al-ibtihaj bi-tatriz al-Dibaj was a biographical dictionary of Maliki jurisprudents, containing within it a voluminous amount of information on North African scholars and is the primary source of information for when it comes to the life and works produced by medieval West African Muslim scholars. This was his greatest contribution to scholarship.

Notable works and manuscripts

Hundreds of thousands of manuscripts were written in Timbuktu. In this, a mass trade of books was established and became one of the most profitable industries in the city. The manuscripts were produced in the Arabic script and were primarily written in the Arabic language, but other local languages such as Fulfulde, Songhai, Soninke and Bambara were also featured. This helped form an invaluable record of Islam and history of West Africa.

Tarikh al-Sudan 
The Tarikh al-Sudan was a written work created by Abd al-Rahman and completed in 1655. It details the history of the Middle Niger region beginning from the founding of Timbuktu until the invasion and occupation of Ahmed al-Mansur of Morocco. These records were sourced from previous written and oral histories about the same subject. This work is highly credited as being one of the most important primary sources that discusses about the history of the Middle Niger region.

Tarikh al-Fattash 
The Ta'rīkh al-Fattāsh is a written work created by Mahmud Kati, but completed in 1665 by his three sons and grandson. It chronicles the history of the Middle Niger region, similar to the Tarikh al-Sudan. The Soninke author of Ta'rikh al-Fattash, Ibn al-Mukhtar, recorded the oral tradition surrounding the origin of the Mali kingdom four hundred years earlier. Ibn al-Mukhtar states:

Condition 
The manuscripts were mainly found in a collection of loose leaves placed within a loose cover or even just tightened with a ribbon. Due to the lack of a sewing structure or any link between the text blocks and covers, knowing whether any bookbinding structures existed or not is a difficult task for many codicologists. What further complicates this is that covers wrapping numerous leaves may have been moved from one text block to another. A manuscript could consist of a variety of texts and documents and can be made of a varying number of leaves ranging from just a few to a few hundred. Today, the Timbuktu manuscripts are primarily preserved in private families which are where they have traditionally been kept and in the Ahmed Baba Institute, a state run entity.

Post-2012 crisis 
In 2013, al-Qaeda in the Islamic Maghreb (AQIM) captured northern Mali and destroyed many of the manuscripts in an attempt to implement their jihad against any idea or practice which did not conform to their own vision of a pure Islamic society. Haidara did this with the help of the NGO SAVAMA-DCI (Sauvegarde et Valorisation des Manuscripts pour la Défense de la Culture Islamique), of which Haidara is the Executive President. Haidara worked alongside members of the local community in an effort to remove the manuscripts from areas which were susceptible to AQIM activity.

External links
 Islamic Manuscripts from Mali - U.S. Library of Congress

References

History of Mali
Mali Empire
Songhai Empire
Ancient universities
Timbuktu
Educational institutions established in the 10th century
Education in the medieval Islamic world